In any quantitative science, the terms relative change and relative difference are used to compare two quantities while taking into account the "sizes" of the things being compared, i.e. dividing by a standard or reference or starting value. The comparison is expressed as a ratio and is a unitless number. By multiplying these ratios by 100 they can be expressed as percentages so the terms percentage change, percent(age) difference, or relative percentage difference are also commonly used. The terms "change" and "difference" are used interchangeably. Relative change is often used as a quantitative indicator of quality assurance and quality control for repeated measurements where the outcomes are expected to be the same. A special case of percent change (relative change expressed as a percentage) called percent error occurs in measuring situations where the reference value is the accepted or actual value (perhaps theoretically determined) and the value being compared to it is experimentally determined (by measurement).

The relative change formula is not well-behaved under many conditions and various alternative formulas, called indicators of relative difference, have been proposed in the literature. Several authors have found log change and log points to be satisfactory indicators, but these have not seen widespread use.

Definition 

Given two numerical quantities, x and y, with y a reference value (a theoretical/actual/correct/accepted/optimal/starting, etc. value), their actual change, actual difference, or absolute change . The term absolute difference is sometimes also used even though the absolute value is not taken; the sign of Δ typically is uniform, e.g. across an increasing data series. If the relationship of the value with respect to the reference value (that is, larger or smaller) does not matter in a particular application, the absolute value may be used in place of the actual change in the above formula to produce a value for the relative change which is always non-negative. The actual difference is not usually a good way to compare the numbers, because it depends on the unit of measurement. For instance, 1 meter is the same as 100 centimeters, but the absolute difference between 2 m and 1 m is 1 while the absolute difference between 200 cm and 100 cm is 100, giving the impression of a larger difference. We can adjust the comparison to take into account the "size" of the quantities involved, by defining, for positive values of xreference:

The relative change is independent of the unit of measurement employed; for example, the relative change from 2 meters to 1 meter is -50%, the same as for 200 cm to 100 cm. The relative change is not defined if the reference value (xreference) is zero, and gives negative values for positive increases if xreference is negative, hence it is not usually defined for negative reference values either. For example, we might want to calculate the relative change of a thermometer from −10 °C to −6 °C. The above formula gives , indicating a decrease, yet in fact the reading increased.

Measures of relative difference are unitless numbers expressed as a fraction. Corresponding values of percent difference would be obtained by multiplying these values by 100 (and appending the % sign to indicate that the value is a percentage).

Domain 

The domain restriction of relative change to positive numbers often poses a constraint. To avoid this problem it is common to take the absolute value, so that the relative change formula works correctly for all nonzero values of xreference:

This still does not solve the issue when the reference is zero. For example, for arithmetic mean this formula may be used:

Percent error
The percent error is a special case of the percentage form of relative change calculated from the absolute change between the experimental (measured) and theoretical (accepted) values, and dividing by the theoretical (accepted) value.

The terms "Experimental" and "Theoretical" used in the equation above are commonly replaced with similar terms. Other terms used for experimental could be "measured," "calculated," or "actual" and another term used for theoretical could be "accepted."  Experimental value is what has been derived by use of calculation and/or measurement and is having its accuracy tested against the theoretical value, a value that is accepted by the scientific community or a value that could be seen as a goal for a successful result.

Although it is common practice to use the absolute value version of relative change when discussing percent error, in some situations, it can be beneficial to remove the absolute values to provide more information about the result. Thus, if an experimental value is less than the theoretical value, the percent error will be negative. This negative result provides additional information about the experimental result. For example, experimentally calculating the speed of light and coming up with a negative percent error says that the experimental value is a velocity that is less than the speed of light. This is a big difference from getting a positive percent error, which means the experimental value is a velocity that is greater than the speed of light (violating the theory of relativity) and is a newsworthy result.

The percent error equation, when rewritten by removing the absolute values, becomes:

It is important to note that the two values in the numerator do not commute. Therefore, it is vital to preserve the order as above: subtract the theoretical value from the experimental value and not vice versa.

Percentage change

A percentage change is a way to express a change in a variable. It represents the relative change between the old value and the new one.

For example, if a house is worth $100,000 today and the year after its value goes up to $110,000, the percentage change of its value can be expressed as

It can then be said that the worth of the house went up by 10%.

More generally, if V1 represents the old value and V2 the new one,

When the variable in question is a percentage itself, it is better to talk about its change by using percentage points, to avoid confusion between relative difference and absolute difference.

Example of percentages of percentages
If a bank were to raise the interest rate on a savings account from 3% to 4%, the statement that "the interest rate was increased by 1%" would be ambiguous. The absolute change in this situation is 1 percentage point (4% − 3%), but the relative change in the interest rate is:

In general, the term "percentage point(s)" indicates an absolute change or difference of percentages, while the percent sign or the word "percentage" refers to the relative change or difference.

Examples

Comparisons
Car M costs $50,000 and car L costs $40,000. We wish to compare these costs. That is, car M costs $10,000 more than car L. The relative difference is,

and we say that car M costs 25% more than car L. It is also common to express the comparison as a ratio, which in this example is,

and we say that car M costs 125% of the cost of car L.

In this example the cost of car L was considered the reference value, but we could have made the choice the other way and considered the cost of car M as the reference value. The absolute difference is now  since car L costs $10,000 less than car M. The relative difference,

is also negative since car L costs 20% less than car M. The ratio form of the comparison,

says that car L costs 80% of what car M costs.

It is the use of the words "of" and "less/more than" that distinguish between ratios and relative differences.

Indicators of relative difference 

An indicator of relative change  is a binary real-valued function defined for the domain of interest which satisfies the following properties:

 Appropriate sign:  iff ,  iff ,  iff .
  is an increasing function of  when  is fixed.
  is continuous.
 Independent of the unit of measurement: for all , .

Due to the independence condition, every such function  can be written as a single argument function  of the ratio . It is also clear that if  satisfies the other conditions then  will as well, for every . We thus further restrict indicators to normalized such that .

Usually the indicator of relative difference is presented as the actual difference Δ scaled by some function of the values x and y, say .

As with relative change, the relative difference is undefined if  is zero. Various choices for the function  have been proposed:

Maximum mean change has been recommended when comparing floating point values in programming languages for equality with a certain tolerance. Another application is in the computation of approximation errors when the relative error of a measurement is required. Minimum mean change has been recommended for use in econometrics. Logarithmic change has been recommended as a general-purpose replacement for relative change and is discussed more below.

Tenhunen defines a general relative change function:

	
which leads to

In particular for the special cases ,

Logarithmic change

Of these indicators of relative difference, the most natural is the natural logarithm (ln) of the ratio of the two numbers, called log change. Indeed, when , the following approximation holds:

In the same way that relative change is scaled by 100 to get percentages,  can be scaled by 100 to get what is commonly called log points. Log points are equivalent to the unit centinepers (cNp) when measured for root-power quantities. This quantity has also been referred to as a log percentage and denoted  L%.
Since the derivative of the natural log at 1 is 1, log points are approximately equal to percentage difference for small differences – for example an increase of 1% equals an increase of 0.995 cNp, and a 5% increase gives a 4.88 cNp increase. This approximation property does not hold for other choices of logarithm base, which introduce a scaling factor due to the derivative not being 1. Log points can thus be used as a replacement for percentage differences.

Additivity 

Using log change has the advantages of additivity compared to relative change. Specifically, when using log change, the total change after a series of changes equals the sum of the changes. With percent, summing the changes is only an approximation, with larger error for larger changes. For example:

Note that in the above table, since relative change 0 (respectively relative change 1) has the same numerical value as log change 0 (respectively log change 1), it does not correspond to the same variation.

By additivity, and therefore additivity implies a sort of symmetry property, namely  and thus the magnitude of a change expressed in log change is the same whether V0 or V1 is chosen as the reference. In contrast, for relative change, with the difference  becoming larger as V1 or V0 approaches 0 while the other remains fixed. For example:

Here 0+ means taking the limit from above towards 0.

Uniqueness and extensions 

The log change is the unique two-variable function that is additive, and whose linearization matches relative change.

See also

Approximation error
Errors and residuals in statistics
Relative standard deviation
Logarithmic scale

Notes

References
 
 
 
 
 
 

Measurement
Numerical analysis
Statistical ratios
Subtraction